These are the rivers of Syria.

Tributaries are listed under the river into which they flow.

Flowing into the Mediterranean 
Orontes (Asi)
Afrin River
Karasu
Nahr al-Kabir al-Shamali, or Northern Great River
Nahr al-Kabir al-Janoubi, or Southern Great River (On the border between Syria and Lebanon)

Flowing into the Persian Gulf by the Shatt al-Arab
Tigris (On the border between Syria and Iraq)
Euphrates
Khabur
Wadi Radd
Wadi Khnezir
Wadi Jarrah
Jaghjagh River
Wadi Khanzir
Wadi Avedji
Balikh
Wadi al-Kheder
Wadi Qaramogh
Sajur River

Flowing into endorheic basins

Aleppo basin 
Quweiq

Ghouta oasis 
Barada

Al-Hijanah Lake 
Awaj

Dead Sea 
Jordan River
Yarmouk (On the border between Syria and Jordan)
Banias River

See also 
Water resources management in Syria

Syria
Rivers